Gold Fever may refer to:
 Gold fever
 Gold Fever (American TV series), a documentary television series airing on The Outdoor Channel
 Gold Fever (British TV series), a BBC documentary
 Gold Fever (film), a 1952 American Western film